The concept of multiple discovery (also known as simultaneous invention) is the hypothesis that most scientific discoveries and inventions are made independently and more or less simultaneously by multiple scientists and inventors. The concept of multiple discovery opposes a traditional view—the "heroic theory" of invention and discovery.  Multiple discovery is analogous to convergent evolution in biological evolution.

Multiples
When Nobel laureates are announced annually—especially in physics, chemistry, physiology, medicine, and economics—increasingly, in the given field, rather than just a single laureate, there are two, or the maximally permissible three, who often have independently made the same discovery.

Historians and sociologists have remarked the occurrence, in science, of "multiple independent discovery". Robert K. Merton defined such "multiples" as instances in which similar discoveries are made by scientists working independently of each other. Merton contrasted a "multiple" with a "singleton"—a discovery that has been made uniquely by a single scientist or group of scientists working together. As Merton said, "Sometimes the discoveries are simultaneous or almost so; sometimes a scientist will make a new discovery which, unknown to him, somebody else has made years before."

Commonly cited examples of multiple independent discovery are the 17th-century independent formulation of calculus by Isaac Newton, Gottfried Wilhelm Leibniz and others, described by A. Rupert Hall; the 18th-century discovery of oxygen by Carl Wilhelm Scheele, Joseph Priestley, Antoine Lavoisier and others; and the theory of evolution of species, independently advanced in the 19th century by Charles Darwin and Alfred Russel Wallace. What holds for discoveries, also goes for inventions. Examples are the blast furnace (invented independently in China, Europe and Africa), the crossbow (invented independently in China, Greece, Africa, northern Canada, and the Baltic countries), and magnetism (discovered independently in Greece, China, and India).

Multiple independent discovery, however, is not limited to only a few historic instances involving giants of scientific research. Merton believed that it is multiple discoveries, rather than unique ones, that represent the common pattern in science.

Mechanism

Multiple discoveries in the history of science provide evidence for evolutionary models of science and technology, such as memetics (the study of self-replicating units of culture), evolutionary epistemology (which applies the concepts of biological evolution to study of the growth of human knowledge), and cultural selection theory (which studies sociological and cultural evolution in a Darwinian manner).

A recombinant-DNA-inspired "paradigm of paradigms" has been posited, that describes a mechanism of "recombinant conceptualization". This paradigm predicates that a new concept arises through the crossing of pre-existing concepts and facts. This is what is meant when one says that a scientist or artist has been "influenced by" another—etymologically, that a concept of the latter's has "flowed into" the mind of the former.  Not every new concept so formed will be viable: adapting social Darwinist Herbert Spencer's phrase, only the fittest concepts survive.

Multiple independent discovery and invention, like discovery and invention generally, have been fostered by the evolution of means of communication: roads, vehicles, sailing vessels, writing, printing, institutions of education, reliable postal services, telegraphy, and mass media, including the internet.  Gutenberg's invention of printing (which itself involved a number of discrete inventions) substantially facilitated the transition from the Middle Ages to modern times. All these communication developments have catalyzed and accelerated the process of recombinant conceptualization, and thus also of multiple independent discovery.

Multiple independent discoveries show an increased incidence beginning in the 17th century.  This may accord with the thesis of British philosopher A.C. Grayling that the 17th century was crucial in the creation of the modern  world view, freed from the shackles of religion, the occult, and uncritical faith in the authority of Aristotle.  Grayling speculates that Europe's Thirty Years' War (1618–1648), with the concomitant breakdown of authority, made freedom of thought and open debate possible, so that "modern science... rests on the heads of millions of dead."  He also notes "the importance of the development of a reliable postal service... in enabling savants... to be in scholarly communication.... [T]he cooperative approach, first recommended by Francis Bacon, was essential to making science open to peer review and public verification, and not just a matter of the lone [individual] issuing... idiosyncratic pronouncements."

Humanities
The paradigm of recombinant conceptualization (see above)—more broadly, of recombinant occurrences—that explains multiple discovery in science and the arts, also elucidates the phenomenon of historic recurrence, wherein similar events are noted in the histories of countries widely separated in time and geography. It is the recurrence of patterns that lends a degree of prognostic power—and, thus, additional scientific validity—to the findings of history.

The arts
Lamb and Easton, and others, have argued that science and art are similar with regard to multiple discovery. When two scientists independently make the same discovery, their papers are not word-for-word identical, but the core ideas in the papers are the same; likewise, two novelists may independently write novels with the same core themes, though their novels are not identical word-for-word.

Civility

After Isaac Newton and Gottfried Wilhelm Leibniz had exchanged information on their respective systems of calculus in the 1670s, Newton in the first edition of his Principia (1687), in a scholium, apparently accepted Leibniz's independent discovery of calculus.  In 1699, however, a Swiss mathematician suggested to Britain's Royal Society that Leibniz had borrowed his calculus from Newton.  In 1705 Leibniz, in an anonymous review of Newton's Opticks, implied that Newton's fluxions (Newton's term for differential calculus) were an adaptation of Leibniz's calculus.  In 1712 the Royal Society appointed a committee to examine the documents in question; the same year, the Society published a report, written by Newton himself, asserting his priority.  Soon after Leibniz died in 1716, Newton denied that his own 1687 Principia scholium "allowed [Leibniz] the invention of the calculus differentialis independently of my own"; and the third edition of Newton's Principia (1726) omitted the tell-tale scholium.  It is now accepted that Newton and Leibniz discovered calculus independently of each other.

In another classic case of multiple discovery, the two discoverers showed more civility.  By June 1858 Charles Darwin had completed over two-thirds of his On the Origin of Species when he received a startling letter from a naturalist, Alfred Russel Wallace, 13 years his junior, with whom he had corresponded.  The letter summarized Wallace's theory of natural selection, with conclusions identical to Darwin's own.  Darwin turned for advice to his friend Charles Lyell, the foremost geologist of the day.  Lyell proposed that Darwin and Wallace prepare a joint communication to the scientific community.  Darwin being preoccupied with his mortally ill youngest son, Lyell enlisted Darwin's closest friend, Joseph Hooker, director of Kew Gardens, and together on 1 July 1858 they presented to the Linnean Society a joint paper that brought together Wallace's abstract with extracts from Darwin's earlier, 1844 essay on the subject.  The paper was also published that year in the Society's journal.  Neither the public reading of the joint paper nor its publication attracted interest; but Wallace, "admirably free from envy or jealousy," had been content to remain in Darwin's shadow.

See also

 Axial Age
 Coincidence
 Convergent evolution
 Discovery (observation)
 Great minds think alike
 Historic recurrence
 History of science
 Hundredth monkey effect
 Invention
 List of multiple discoveries
 Logology (science of science)
 Matilda effect
 Matthew effect
 Opposing theories of discovery and invention:
Great man theory
Heroic theory of invention and scientific development
 Reinventing the wheel
 Scientific priority
 Serendipity
 Stigler's law of eponymy
 Synchronicity
 Twin films
 Zeitgeist

References and notes

Further reading
 Kasparek, Christopher, "Prus' Pharaoh:  the Creation of a Historical Novel", The Polish Review, vol. XXXIX, no. 1, 1994, pp. 45–50.
 Lamb, David, and S.M. Easton, chapter 9:  Originality in art and science, Multiple Discovery: The Pattern of Scientific Progress, Amersham, Avebury Publishing, 1984, .   
 Colin McGinn, "Groping Toward the Mind" (review of George Makari, Soul Machine:  The Invention of the Modern Mind, Norton, 656 pp., $39.95; and A.C. Grayling, The Age of Genius:  The Seventeenth Century and the Birth of the Modern Mind, Bloomsbury, 351 pp., $30.00), The New York Review of Books, vol. LXIII, no. 11 (June 23, 2016), pp. 67–68.
 
 
 Whalen, Eamon, "The Man Who Saw It Coming: Rob Wallace warned us that industrial agriculture could cause a deadly pandemic, but no one listened. Until now." (article on Rob Wallace and his books, Big Farms Make Big Flu: Dispatches on Influenza, Agribusiness, and the Nature of Science and Dead Epidemiologists: On the Origins of COVID-19), The Nation, vol. 313, no. 5 (September 6/13, 2021), pp. 14–19.

External links
 "Annals of Innovation: In the Air: Who says big ideas are rare?", Malcolm Gladwell, The New Yorker, May 12, 2008
 The Technium: Simultaneous Invention, Kevin Kelly, May 9, 2008
 , Peter Turney, January 15, 2007

Discovery and invention controversies
Heuristics
History of scientific method
Innovation
Theories of history